Desmond James Negri (15 November 1923 – 7 May 2003) was an Australian rules footballer who played with Collingwood and Richmond in the Victorian Football League (VFL).

Family
The son of Angelo Monigatti Negri (1880-1940), and Adelaide Negri (1892-1944), née Tiernan, Desmond James Negri was born on 15 November 1923.

Handball
Given that CBC Parade was a Christian Brothers' college, handball was very strongly promoted among the students, driven by the Brothers' view that handball "affords an excellent preparatory training for football, as it calls into play all the resources of the physical man". Handball is one of the best ways for a potential Australian Rules footballer to acquire the optimum level of hand–eye coordination, ambidexterity, smoothness and flexibility, and sense of where one is in time and space (e.g., St Kilda's Ted Terry was a schoolboy champion in Tasmania, and Collingwood's Bill Serong, also from CBC Parade, was the Australian handball champion in 1974, aged 38).

Like his older brother, the Collingwood footballer Francis Angelo Negri (1917-1944), as a schoolboy, Negri excelled at handball, and was the Australian Schoolboy Champion in 1939.

Football

Collingwood (VFL)
Recruited from East Melbourne C.Y.M.S., he played with the Collingwood Second XVIII in 1941, and made his senior debut against Essendon, at Victoria Park, on 30 May 1942.

Richmond (VFL)
He was cleared from Collingwood to Richmond in June 1945; and in 1945 he played two games for the Richmond First XVIII and 9 games for the Second XVIII.

Coburg (VFA)
Cleared from Richmond on 21 May 1946, he played in six First XVIII matches for Coburg in 1946. He injured his back and did not play for Coburg again.

Australs (NWQAFL)
By 1952 he was working in the Mount Isa mines in North West Queensland; and, in 1958 he was the premiership-winning captain-coach of the Mount Isa-based Australs Football Club that competed in the North-Western Queensland Australian Football League.<ref>The Australs Football Club ceased to function in 1961, when the Mount Isa competition was abandoned due to "collateral damage" from an extended industrial dispute between miners and the Mount Isa Mines. The Mount Isa competition was revived in 1967, and the former Australs Football Club and the former Rovers Football Club combined to form the Irish Rovers Football Club, now known as the Mount Isa Rovers Australian Football Club. (see: [https://websites.sportstg.com/club_info.cgi?client=0-3945-48525-428395-25652075&sID=56429&&news_task=DETAIL&articleID=61754314 History of the Rovers, Mount Isa Rovers AFC".]</ref>

 Notes 
	

References
 Hogan P: The Tigers Of Old, Richmond FC, (Melbourne), 1996. 	
 
 St. Virgil's Annual'', St. Virgil's College, (Hobart), Christmas 1922.

External links 

 		
 Des Negri, at The VFA Project.
 Profile on Collingwood Forever

1923 births
2003 deaths
Australian rules footballers from Victoria (Australia)
Collingwood Football Club players
Richmond Football Club players
Australian people of Italian descent